A snowcat (a portmanteau of snow and caterpillar) is an enclosed-cab, truck-sized, fully tracked vehicle designed to move on snow. Major manufacturers are PistenBully (Germany), Prinoth (Italy) and Tucker (United States).

Snow groomers

A snowcat dedicated to snow maintenance rather than transport is a snow groomer. Other terms are "piste machines", "trail groomers" (in North American English) or "piste bashers" (in British English) because of their use in preparing ski trails ("pistes") or snowmobile trails.

Other functions
In addition to grooming snow they are used for polar expeditions, logging in marsh areas, leveling sugar beet piles, medical evacuations, and seismic studies in the wild.

Construction

Most snowcats, such as the ones produced by Bombardier or Aktiv in the past, have two sets of tracks, fitted with a Christie suspension or a Horstmann suspension. Others, like the Tucker Sno-Cat and Hägglunds Bandvagn 206 vehicles, have a complex arrangement of four or more tracks.

The tracks are usually made of rubber, aluminum or steel and driven by a single sprocket on each side, and ride over rubber wheels with a solid foam interior. Their design is optimized for a snow surface, or soft grounds such as that of a peat bog.

The cabs are optimized for use in sub-zero weather or cold conditions worsened by wind chill, with strong forced heating and a windshield designed to be kept clear of internal and external ice or condensation through a variety of means such as advanced coatings, external scrapers (windshield wipers of a modified type), and internal ducts blowing hot air on the surface.

History
The forerunners of the snowcat were the tracked "motors" designed by Captain Scott and his engineer Reginald Skelton for the Antarctic Terra Nova Expedition of 1910–1913. These tracked motors were built by the Wolseley Tool and Motor Car Company in Birmingham. In the 1955–1958 Fuchs and Hillary Transantarctic Expedition, four modern snowcats were used, produced by the Tucker Sno-Cat Corporation of Medford, Oregon. These vehicles were highly modified for the purposes of the expedition.

The name "snowcat" originates from the 1946 trademark by Tucker Sno-Cat Corporation. This specialized over-snow vehicle dominated the snow transportation market until the 1960s when other manufacturers entered the business. By then "snowcat" was such a common description that it was used to describe all over-snow vehicles (see generic trademark). Tucker is also well known for its use of four tracks on its vehicles. Tucker Sno-Cat is arguably the best known of the early manufacturers and remains in business today. Tucker Sno-Cats have been used by numerous military, governmental agencies and utilities.

Another early model was the Swedish made Aktiv Snow Trac of which 2265 were manufactured in Sweden between 1957 and 1981. NATO forces used the Snow Trac successfully during the Cold War between NATO and the USSR. Numerous accounts from Antarctica related successful use of the Snow Trac by research organizations such as A.N.A.R.E. in Antarctica.

Thiokol sold its ski-lift and snowcat operation in 1978 to John DeLorean, and changed its name to DeLorean Motor Company (DMC). DMC was later bought out by its management team and renamed Logan Machine Company (LMC). LMC ceased production in 2000. Thiokol's Imp, Super-Imp and Spryte were popular dual-track snowcats and Thiokol's production continued under DMC and LMC. The Spryte, sold later as 1200 and 1500 series machines, are still popular in commercial and industrial use, nearly 20 years after the end of their production runs. Many of these models are still in use today in the commercial market and are popular as privately owned snowcats.

Between 1956 and 1968, KRISTI snowcat had a limited production of two-track snowcats in Colorado; it never became popular and ceased production with fewer than 200 total units produced.

In 1982, Aktiv Snow Trac ceased assembly when its engine supplier (Volkswagen) ceased production of its air-cooled engines in Europe. Over 1000 Snow Tracs were imported to Canada and the United States, mostly by Canadian utilities and U.S. governmental agencies; the Snow Trac is still in common use in private ownership and to a lesser degree in commerce having produced over 2200 total machines which saw popular use all over the globe.

Current production
Bombardier still continues in business but has radically altered its business model and product selection and sold its snow grooming division and no longer makes commercial snowcats. Bombardier sold over 3000 of its popular snow bus models which are still in use today and in popular demand by dedicated collectors; thousands of other Bombardier models were also produced as ski-slope and snowmobile trail groomers with the Bombi and BR100 to 180 series machines as notable units produced in high quantities. Bombardier Recreational Products still produces the Ski-Doo line of open ridge single-tracked personal snowmobiles.

Russia as one of the snowiest countries in the world has a wide range of snowcat producers, from the big 30-ton load capacity two linked-track Vityaz vehicles to 0.4-2 ton load capacity ZZGT vehicles.

The first 100% electric snow groomer was launched by Kässbohrer in June 2019.

Gallery

See also

 Antarctic snow cruiser
 Bandvagn 202
 Bandvagn 206
 BvS 10
 Continuous track (the method of propulsion of a snowcat)
 Snow coach
 Snowcat skiing

Notes and references

Books

External links

 Video of a snowcat at work
 Kässbohrer Geländefahrzeug - manufacturer of PistenBully
 ZZGT - Russian snowcat producer
 Ohara Corporation: Snow Vehicles - Japanese manufacturer
 Snowcat Sculpting  Video produced by Oregon Field Guide

Tracked vehicles
Snowmobiles